This page covers all the important events in the sport of tennis in 2023. It provides the results of notable tournaments throughout the year on both the ATP and WTA Tours, the Davis Cup, and the Billie Jean King Cup.

ITF

Grand Slam events

References

External links 
 Official website of the Association of Tennis Professionals (ATP)
 Official website of the Women's Tennis Association (WTA)
 Official website of the International Tennis Federation (ITF)
 Official website of the International Team Competition in Men's Tennis (Davis Cup)
 Official website of the International Team Competition in Women's Tennis (Fed Cup)

Tennis by year